Beginning in 2016, Apple Inc. began to produce and distribute its own original content. The first television show produced by Apple was Planet of the Apps, a reality competition series. Their second, released in late 2017, was Carpool Karaoke: The Series based on the popular recurring segment from The Late Late Show with James Corden. Apple also released a short film, Peanuts in Space: Secrets of Apollo 10 in May 2019 prior to the release of Apple TV+.

In June 2017, Apple appointed Jamie Erlicht and Zack Van Amburg to head their newly formed worldwide video unit. By November, Apple confirmed that it was branching out into original scripted programming when announcing straight-to-series orders for two television shows: a reboot of the anthology series Amazing Stories by Steven Spielberg, and The Morning Show, a drama series starring Jennifer Aniston and Reese Witherspoon.

In 2017, Apple was reportedly planning on spending around $1 billion on original programming over the next year. Later that year, another report projected that they would spend $4.2 billion on original programming by 2022. In August 2019, it was reported that Apple had already spent over $6 billion on original programming.

On March 25, 2019, Apple announced their streaming service as Apple TV+, along with the announcement of Apple's slate of original programming. The service launched on November 1, 2019, in over 100 countries through the Apple TV app.

On March 13, 2020, Apple suspended active filming on most Apple TV+ shows due to the COVID-19 pandemic, with production on series being postponed indefinitely; Apple began to resume production on all series by late summer of 2020.

Original programming

Drama

Comedy

Kids & family

Animation

Adult animation

Kids & family

Non-English language scripted

Unscripted

Docuseries

Reality

Sports programming

Variety

Co-productions
These shows have been commissioned by Apple TV+ with a partner network.

Continuations

Specials

Upcoming original programming

Drama

Comedy

Animation

Adult animation

Kids & family

Non-English language scripted

Unscripted

Docuseries

Continuations

Co-productions

In development

Notes

References

External links
  of Apple TV+

Apple TV+
 
Apple TV+
Apple TV+
Apple TV+